Fagu Roșu River may refer to:

Fagu Roșu, a tributary of the Senetea in Harghita County, Romania
Fagu Roșu, a tributary of the Șicasău in Harghita County, Romania

See also 
Fagu River (disambiguation)
Făget River (disambiguation)
Făgețel River (disambiguation)